Hideaway is the fifth studio album by American jazz fusion artist David Sanborn, released by Warner Bros. Records in February 1980. The album was produced by Michael Colina.

It was recorded at Celebration Recording Studios in New York in 1979, with the album cover depicting sunset along a shoreline. This album performed well on the Billboard jazz and R&B charts, peaking at #2 and #33 respectively.

Track listing

Personnel 
Below is a list of personnel per the liner notes of the 1987 US CD reissue:

 David Sanborn – alto saxophone,  soprano saxophone (1), tenor saxophone (1), Fender Rhodes (1, 5), handclaps (3), Hammond B3 organ (7)
 Michael Colina – synthesizers (1, 4), string arrangements (2, 5, 6, 8), Polymoog (3, 6, 7, 8), Crumar electric piano (3, 8), acoustic piano (4), Fender Rhodes (6), acoustic bass (7)
 Don Grolnick – clavinet (1, 3), Fender Rhodes (2, 7), acoustic piano (8)
 Paul Shaffer – Fender Rhodes (4)
 Rob Mounsey – Yamaha electric piano (6)
 Hiram Bullock – electric guitar (1)
 David Spinozza – electric guitar (3, 5, 6, 8), acoustic guitar (5, 6)
 Jeff Mironov – guitars (4)
 Danny Kortchmar – electric guitar (7)
 Waddy Wachtel – electric guitar (7)
 Neil Jason – bass (1, 3, 4, 6, 8), fretless bass (5)
 Marcus Miller – bass (2)
 John Evans – bass (7)
 Steve Gadd – drums (1, 3, 5, 6, 8)
 Rick Marotta – drums (2, 7)
 Buddy Williams – drums (4)
 Ray Bardani – percussion (1, 6), cowbell (3), handclaps (3), tambourine (3, 4, 8), hi-hat (7), cabasa (8)
 Ralph MacDonald – congas (1, 6), percussion (1, 2), finger cymbals (5), triangle (5)
 Michael Mainieri – electric vibraphone (2), marimba (2), bass marimba (2)
 Jody Linscott – congas (3, 5, 7, 8), cowbell (5), cabasa (7), devil stick (7)
 Lisa Nalven – handclaps (3)
 Spike – handclaps (3)
 Julian Fifer – cello (2, 5, 6, 8)
 Richard Sher – cello (2, 5, 6, 8)
 Ronnie Bauch – violin (2, 5, 6, 8)
 Guillermo Figueroa – violin (2, 5, 6, 8)
 William Henry – violin (2, 5, 6, 8)
 Benjamin Hudson – violin (2, 5, 6, 8)
 Joanna Jenner – violin (2, 5, 6, 8)
 How Liang-Ping – violin (2, 5, 6, 8)
 Ruth Waterman – violin (2, 5, 6, 8)
 Carol Zeavin – violin (2, 5, 6, 8)
 James Taylor – backing vocals (2)
 David Lasley – backing vocals (2)
 Arnold McCuller – backing vocals (2)
 Naimy Hackett – backing vocals (3)
 Bette Sussman – backing vocals (3)

Production
 John Simon – executive producer
 Michael Colina – producer 
 Ray Bardani – producer (4), recording, mixing 
 George Marino – mastering at Sterling Sound (New York, NY)
 Allen Grogin – production assistant 
 Katherine Jewel – album coordinator
 Basil Pao – art direction, design 
 Aram Gesar – cover photography 
 David Gahr – portrait photography

Chart positions

References 

David Sanborn albums
1980 albums
Jazz fusion albums by American artists
Albums produced by Michael Colina
Warner Records albums